is a railway station in the town of Kanie, Ama District, Aichi Prefecture, Japan, operated by the private railway operator Kintetsu Railway.

Lines
Tomiyoshi Station is served by the Kintetsu Nagoya Line, and is located 12.1 kilometers from the terminus of the line at Kintetsu Nagoya Station.

Station layout
The station has two island platforms and a elevated staffed station building. The station is located within an apartment building.

Platforms

Adjacent stations

Station history
Tomiyoshi Station opened on December 10, 1964 as a station on the Kintetsu Nagoya Line.

Passenger statistics
In fiscal 2017, the station was used by an average of 5186 passengers daily. y.

Surrounding area
Tomiyoshi Housing Complex
JR Central Eiwa Station

See also
 List of Railway Stations in Japan

References

External links

 Official web page 

Railway stations in Aichi Prefecture
Stations of Kintetsu Railway
Railway stations in Japan opened in 1964
Kanie, Aichi